Karl von Buchka (23 September 1885 in Göttingen – 11 February 1960 in Freiburg, Lower Saxony) was a German politician active in both pre- and post-Second World War politics.

Involved in local politics, Buchka served as Landrat (a district administrator) in Blumenthal District, Hanover from 1917 to 1920 and in the same position in Kehdingen from 1921 to 1932. He was a member of the German People's Party until 1933 when, following Adolf Hitler's seizure of power, he took membership of the Nazi Party as member no. 1,683,854.

Buchka was a member of the Bundestag from 1953 to 1957, representing the Christian Democratic Union of Germany.

References

1885 births
1960 deaths
German People's Party politicians
Nazi Party politicians
Members of the Bundestag for Lower Saxony
Members of the Bundestag 1953–1957
Politicians from Göttingen
Members of the Bundestag for the Christian Democratic Union of Germany
Officers Crosses of the Order of Merit of the Federal Republic of Germany